Alfred Mayer (5 March 1936 – 1 March 2022) was an Austrian politician.

A member of the Austrian People's Party, he served as a Landesrat of Vorarlberg from 1974 to 1993.

He died on 1 March 2022, at the age of 85.

References

1936 births
2022 deaths
Members of the Landtag of Vorarlberg
Austrian People's Party politicians
People from Bregenz